The ISO 56000 is a family of standards designed to provide a framework for organizations to implement, maintain and improve innovation management systems.

See also
 International Standards Organization
 ISO 10006—Quality management—Guidelines to quality management in projects
 ISO 13485—Medical devices—Quality management systems—Requirements for regulatory purposes
 ISO 14001—Environmental management standards
 List of ISO standards
 ISO TC 279

References

External links
 ISO 56000 family at ISO.org 

56000
Innovation